The Olympians are a fictional species appearing in American comic books published by Marvel Comics. These characters are based on the Twelve Olympians/Dii Consentes and other deities of Classical mythology. During the beginning of the 1960s, the exploits of the Asgardians Thor and his evil brother Loki demonstrated that an updating of ancient myths could again win readers. In 1965, Stan Lee and Jack Kirby introduced the Olympians in Journey into Mystery Annual #1.

The Olympians appear in the Marvel Cinematic Universe film Thor: Love and Thunder (2022).

History
The Olympians are a race of extra-dimensional beings that possess a variety of mystical superhuman abilities that were once worshipped by civilizations centered on or around the Mediterranean, Aegean, Ionian, Tyrrhenian and Ligurian seas such as Greece, the Roman Empire and parts of Egypt and Turkey as gods from roughly 2500 BC until roughly 500 AD. The Olympians are related to every other pantheon of gods that have ever been worshiped on Earth, such as the Asgardians and the Gods of Heliopolis (ancient Egypt) because Gaea, the spirit that represents life on Earth, was the mother of the first race of gods to appear on Earth. The various pantheons that exist today are the descendants of these earlier gods. It is believed that the Olympians were born somewhere on Earth but currently reside in another dimension that is adjacent to Earth known as Olympus. One known entrance to this realm is actually located atop Mount Olympus in Greece.

Racial attributes
Most Olympian gods are identical in appearance to humans and are fully capable of having children with humans, other mystical beings, even extraterrestrials. The Olympians are closer to possessing true immortality than most of Earth's pantheons in that they cease to age upon reaching adulthood, though some reach maturity far faster. For instance, Marvel's depiction of Artemis' birth shows her growing rapidly after birth and helping her mother deliver her brother, Apollo. Olympians are immune to conventional disease, and cannot be killed through conventional means. All Olympians possess superhuman strength with males, typically, being stronger than females. The average male Olympian possesses sufficient superhuman strength to lift about 30 tons while the average Olympian female can lift about 25 tons. Several Olympians exceed these averages by a considerable degree due to naturally possessing greater physical strength, though some can augment their strength further by magical means.

The tissues of all Olympians are harder and more resilient than those of a human, granting them superhuman durability, and are roughly 3 times more dense, bolstering their natural strength and resilience. The increased density results in the Olympians being much heavier than most humans, even though they don't appear to be. The average Olympian, both male and female, can withstand extreme temperatures and high caliber bullets without sustaining injury. It is possible for them to be injured, but the mystical energies of their bodies will enable them to heal with much greater speed and with more finality than humans. The average Olympian can repair injuries that result in severe lacerations and loss of blood within a brief period of time without any scarring. More extensive injuries require a longer healing time. Severe injuries, such as severed limbs, can be magically regenerated if the injured Olympian receives treatment within a short period of time after the injury. A small minority of Olympians possess the ability to fully regenerate missing limbs without external aid from other gods. However, any Olympian can die if a significant portion of his or her bodily molecules are scattered. Still, it's possible for a god of extreme power or several gods working together to resurrect those who are slain, though this must also be done shortly after death. The musculature of all Olympians produces considerably fewer fatigue toxins than those of human beings, granting them superhuman stamina in all physical activities.

Some Olympians are born with the potential to harvest great amounts of mystical energy for a variety of purposes, including projecting powerful energy blasts, inter-dimensional teleportation, shapeshifting, temporary augmentation of their physical attributes, and granting other superhuman abilities to affect beings or objects. Among the most prominent of the Olympians possessing vast energy manipulating abilities are Neptune, Pluto and Zeus. Other Olympians possess special attributes unique to them such as Aphrodite's mystical ability to arouse love and passion in others and transform weapons into objects of peace or Apollo's ability to generate heat and light equal to that of a small sun.

Known members
 Apollo (Phoebus Apollo) - Apollo is the god of light, music, poetry, prophecy, medicine and science. As the god of light, he can produce heat and light equivalent to a small sun. As the god of prophecy, he can see the future and the possible outcomes of actions.
 Ares - Ares is the god of war.
 Artemis - The goddess of wild animals, the hunt, and moonlight.
 Athena (Athena Parthenos) - Athena is the goddess of wisdom and war. She is killed by Hercules when she sides with the Chaos King and is later restored to life following the Chaos King's defeat.
 Bia - Bia is the god of Might.
 Cupid (Eros) - Cupid is the god of love.
 Deimos - Deimos is the god of terror.
 Demeter - Demeter is the goddess of plants and agriculture.
 Dionysus (Dionysus Acratophorus), (Bacchus) - Dionysus is the god of wine, theater and revelry/entertainment.
 Eris (Discord) - Eris is the goddess of strife.
 Furies - The Goddesses of Vengeance.
 Dark Lady (Tisiphone) - Together with her sisters, Dark Lady is one of the Furies.
 Ember (Alecto) - Together with her sisters, Ember is one of the Furies.
 Lady Ash (Magaera) - Together with her sisters, Lady Ash is one of the goddesses of vengeance known as the Furies.
 Hebe - Hebe is the goddess of youth.
 Hecate - Hecate is the goddess of magic, witchcraft, necromancy and crossroads.
 Hephaestus (Hephaestus Aetnaeus) - Hephaestus is the god of fire and metallurgy. He is also the Gods' blacksmith.
 Hera (Hera Argeia) - Hera is the Queen of the Gods. She is the goddess of marriage and fidelity.
 Hercules (Herakles) - Hercules is the god of strength and labor. He is an Avenger.
 Hermes (Hermes Diaktoros) - Hermes is the god of speed and the messenger of the Gods.  He is the god of boundaries and transitions, as well as of thieves, wrestling, invention and trade.
 The Huntsman (Cephalus) - The Huntsman is a servant of Zeus and later Hera. He is often used as an enforcer against the other gods.
 Kratos - Kratos is the god of force.
 Poseidon (Poseidon Aegaeus) - Poseidon is the god of the sea. As such, he can breathe both in air and water.
 Neptunia (Rhode) - Neptunia is a Sea Goddess.
 Nox (Nyx) - Nox is the goddess of the night, although she may have degenerated into a demon. She is a member of the Fear Lords.
 Pan (Aegipan) - Pan is the god of shepherds and flocks.
 Persephone - Persephone is the Queen of the Underworld. She is also the goddess of spring.
 Phobos - Phobos is the god of fear.
 Pluto (Hades) - Pluto is the god of the underworld making him one of the Hell-Lords.
 Psyche - Psyche is the goddess of fidelity.
 Thanatos - Thanatos is the god of death.
 Tharamus - Tharamus is the god of learning but works as the curator of the Museum of Greek Antiquity. Tharamus is killed by Ares protecting his artifacts.
 Venus (Aphrodite Ourania) - Venus is the goddess of love and beauty. As such, she has the additional abilities to produce love in individuals and turn weapons into objects of peace.
 Vesta (Hestia) - Vesta is the Goddess of the Home.
 Zeus (Zeus Panhellenios) - Zeus is the god of the sky and thunder. As King of the Olympian Gods, he is a member of the Council of Godheads.

In other media
The Olympians appear in Thor: Love and Thunder with Zeus portrayed by Russell Crowe, Dionysus portrayed by Simon Russell Beale, and Hercules portrayed by Brett Goldstein. Zeus and Dionysus appear as members of the Council of Godheads.

See also
 Olympian Gods

References

Marvel Comics deities
Characters created by Jack Kirby
Characters created by Stan Lee
Greek and Roman deities in fiction
Marvel Comics characters with superhuman strength